Baharestan (also Romanized as Bahārestān) is a village in Montazeriyeh Rural District, in the Central District of Tabas County, South Khorasan Province, Iran. At the 2006 census, its population was 40, in 8 families.

References 

Populated places in Tabas County